The Republic XF-91 Thunderceptor (originally designated XP-91) is a mixed-propulsion prototype interceptor aircraft, developed by Republic Aviation. The aircraft would use a jet engine for most flight, and a cluster of four small rocket engines for added thrust during climb and interception. The design was largely obsolete by the time it was completed due to the rapidly increasing performance of contemporary jet engines, and only two prototypes were built. One of these was the first American fighter to exceed Mach 1 in level flight.

A unique feature of the Thunderceptor was its unusual inverse tapered wing, in which the chord length increased along the wing span from the root to the tip, the opposite of conventional swept wing designs. This was an attempt to address the problem of pitch-up, a potentially deadly phenomenon that plagued early high-speed models. The Thunderceptor's design meant the entire wing stalled smoothly, more like a straight-wing design.

Design and development

During the development of the XP-84, Republic, under the guidance of Alexander Kartveli, looked at the installation of rockets to fighters. The company was inspired by German wartime aircraft: the rocket-powered Messerschmitt Me 163 and the experimental rocket-boosted turbojet Messerschmitt Me 262C Heimatschützer (home protector) series of interceptor prototypes.

The Thunderceptor design was one of two swept-wing modifications based on the original Republic F-84 Thunderjet, the other being the Republic F-84F Thunderstreak which was developed later. A serious problem with most swept wing designs of the era was dangerous performance at low speeds and high angle of attack. The stagnant airflow over the wing tended to "slide" towards the wingtips, which caused them to stall before the rest of the wing. In this situation the center of lift would rapidly shift forward relative to the center of mass, pitching the nose up and leading to an even greater angle of attack or, in extreme cases, end-over-end tumbling of the aircraft. Aircraft caught in this regime would often stall and crash, and a rash of such accidents with the North American F-100 Super Sabre led to the term "Sabre dance".

The Thunderceptor's most notable design feature was intended to address this problem. The wings were built to have considerably more chord (distance from the leading edge to the trailing edge) at the tip than root, allowing them to generate more lift. This neatly addressed the problem of Sabre dance by delaying the point of stall on the tip to that of the entire wing. A side-effect of this design was that the tips had more internal room, so the landing gear was mounted to retract outwards with the wheels lying in the wingtips, using two smaller wheels in a tandem arrangement for each main gear strut, instead of one larger one. Another design change was the ability to vary the angle of incidence of the wing as a whole, tilting it up for low speed operations during takeoff and landing, and then "leveling it off" for high-speed flight and cruise. This allowed the fuselage to remain closer to level while landing, greatly improving visibility.

In keeping with its intended role as an interceptor, the nose was redesigned to incorporate a radar antenna, forcing the air intake for the engine to be moved from its original nose-mounted position to a new intake below it. The fuselage was otherwise very similar to the F-84's. The first prototype did not include the radome, although this was fitted to the second prototype.

Testing and evaluation

The first prototype made its first flight on 9 May 1949, breaking the speed of sound in December 1951. It was later modified with a small radome for gunnery ranging (although not the "full" radome of the second prototype). The second prototype included a full radome and chin-mounted intake, but was otherwise similar. With both the jet and rockets running, the aircraft could reach Mach 1.71. Both prototypes completed 192 test flights over the course of five years.

The second prototype, 46-681, had an engine failure during takeoff from Edwards AFB in the summer of 1951. Republic test pilot Carl Bellinger escaped from the aircraft just as the tail melted off only 90 seconds into the flight. It was later used at Edwards AFB as a crash-crew training simulator, then scrapped.

As an interceptor the Thunderceptor was soon eclipsed by designs from other companies, but like the Thunderceptor none of these would go into production. The United States Air Force decided to wait the short time needed to introduce newer and much more capable designs created as a part of the 1954 interceptor project. The Thunderceptor, like the other interceptor designs of the era, had extremely short flight times on the order of 25 minutes, making them almost useless for protecting an area as large as the United States. The 1954 designs outperformed the XF-91 in speed, range, and loiter time, as well as including the radar and fire-control systems needed for night and all-weather operation. The era of the dedicated day fighter-type interceptor was over.

Aircraft on display

The surviving prototype, 46–0680, is exhibited in the Research & Development Gallery at the National Museum of the United States Air Force at Wright-Patterson AFB in Dayton, Ohio.

Specifications (XF-91 Thunderceptor)

See also

References

Notes

Bibliography

 Jenkins, Dennis R. and Tony R. Landis. Experimental & Prototype U.S. Air Force Jet Fighters. North Branch, Minnesota, USA: Specialty Press, 2008. .
 Knaack, Marcelle Size.Encyclopedia of US Air Force Aircraft and Missile Systems: Volume 1, Post-World War II Fighters, 1945–1973. Washington, D.C.: Office of Air Force History, 1978. .
 Pace, Steve. Republic XF-91 Thunderceptor Rocket Fighter (Air Force Legends N.210). Simi Valley, California, USA: Steve Ginter Books, 2000. .
 Pace, Steve. X-Fighters: USAF Experimental and Prototype Fighters, XP-59 to YF-23. St. Paul, Minnesota, USA: Motorbooks International, 1991. .
 Winchester, Jim. The World's Worst Aircraft: From Pioneering Failures to Multimillion Dollar Disasters. London: Amber Books Ltd., 2005. .
 Yeager, Chuck and Leo Janos. Yeager: An Autobiography. New York: Bantam Books, 1986. .
 Yenne, Bill. The World's Worst Aircraft. New York: Dorset Press, 1993. .

Further reading

External links

XF-91 in U.S Centennial of Flight Commission
Several pictures of the XF-91 46-680
Interceptor, 1949 – pictures from Flight 1949

F-091
Republic F-91
Single-engined jet aircraft
Aircraft with auxiliary rocket engines
Mid-wing aircraft
Aircraft first flown in 1949